Palmicellaria is a genus of bryozoans in the family Celleporidae. Some species are known from the fossil record.

See also 
 List of prehistoric bryozoan genera

References 

 Palmicellaria at WoRMS

Cheilostomatida
Bryozoan genera